Feng Office is a software development company known for developing Feng Office Collaboration Platform and associated services:

 Feng Sky  is Feng Office on Demand provided as SaaS
 Feng Onsite  is a Feng Office platform installed on external servers
 Feng Office Community Edition is the open-source self-installed and self-supported version

History 
Feng Office started as The OpenGoo Open Source Project, a degree project at the faculty of Engineering of the University of the Republic, Uruguay. The project was presented and championed by software engineer Conrado Viña. Software engineers Marcos Saiz and Ignacio de Soto developed the first prototype as their thesis. Professors Eduardo Fernández and Tomás Laurenzo  served as tutors. Conrado, Ignacio and Marcos founded the OpenGoo community and remain active members and core developers. The thesis was approved with the highest score.

In 2008 Conrado Viña, Marcos Saiz, Sergio Riestra and Ignacio de Soto started the company Feng Office, taking care of the development and support for the OpenGoo project. In December 2009, Feng Office decided to rebrand OpenGoo as Feng Office.

See also
 Online office suite
 SaaS
 Open source
 Cloud computing
 Computer user satisfaction
 Software plus services

References

Companies based in Montevideo
Software companies of Uruguay
Office suites
Uruguayan brands